This article is a list of saints canonized by Pope John XXIII.

See also
List of saints canonized by Pope Pius XII
List of saints canonized by Pope Paul VI
List of saints canonized by Pope John Paul II
List of saints canonized by Pope Benedict XVI
List of saints canonized by Pope Francis

References

John XXIII